Porter Airlines (stylized in all lowercase as porter) is a regional airline headquartered at Billy Bishop Toronto City Airport on the Toronto Islands in Toronto, Ontario, Canada. Owned by Porter Aviation Holdings, formerly known as REGCO Holdings Inc., Porter operates regularly scheduled flights between Toronto and locations in Canada and the United States using Canadian-built De Havilland Canada DHC-8-400 turboprop aircraft.

Porter's operation at the Toronto airport was launched in 2006 with some controversy. Robert Deluce, who is now the Executive Chairman of Porter Airlines, proposed creating a regional airline using Bombardier turboprop aircraft to service major cities of Canada within the range of Toronto. A planned bridge to the airport was cancelled in 2003, leading to lawsuits between Deluce and the City of Toronto. The airline lost the case in court but the idea for the airline remained. With the compensation received from the Toronto Port Authority for the lawsuit, REGCO bought the island airport terminal used by Air Canada Jazz and terminated Air Canada's access.  Porter has expanded its operations since 2006, adding more destinations and planes. Porter opened a new, larger passenger terminal at the island airport in March 2010. In 2013, Porter made a proposal to expand Toronto Island airport to allow jets. Toronto City Council reserved its support, requiring the controversial proposal to be the focus of Ports Toronto studies. In November 2015, the federal government announced it would not support the proposal. In July 2021, Porter announced that it would begin flying out of Toronto Pearson International Airport and expand its destinations throughout Canada, the United States, and Caribbean, starting in mid-2022.

On March 18, 2020, Porter announced that they would suspend all flights, initially from March 20 through to June 1 due to the ongoing COVID-19 coronavirus pandemic. The suspension of service was then extended several times, until it was announced that Porter will be returning to service starting September 8, 2021, nearly 18 months since all flights were suspended.

In July 2021, it was announced that Porter Airlines had reached an agreement with Canadian Federal Government for loans valued up to US$218.2 million, which will be used primarily as a capital reserve during the COVID-19 recovery period.

Organization

Porter Airlines along with Porter FBO Limited, which operates the Porter facilities at Billy Bishop, and City Centre Terminal Corp., are owned by Porter Aviation Holdings (PAHL), formerly known as REGCO Holdings Inc. The company was founded in 1999.

Porter Aviation Holdings Inc. is controlled by :
Robert Deluce – part of the Deluce aviation family—with brother Peter, son Michael and others has been an owner and/or executive with Air Ontario, Canada 3000 and other airlines.

Principal executives
 Robert J. Deluce is Executive Chairman of Porter Airlines.
 Michael Deluce, Robert's son, is now the President and CEO of Porter Airlines and Porter Aviation Holdings Inc.

 Directors
 Donald J. Carty, a former American Airlines chief executive, is Chairman of the Board of Directors. Carty is also Vice Chairman and CFO at Dell Inc.
 James Little – Chief Marketing Officer at Shaw Communications, Inc.
 David Wilkins – former U.S. ambassador to Canada.
Source: Bloomberg Business Week

Investors
At startup,  million was put into the airline including money from:
EdgeStone Capital Partners
Borealis Infrastructure – the investment arm of the Ontario Municipal Employees Retirement System (OMERS).

In 2009, Porter's institutional investors include EdgeStone Capital Partners, Borealis Infrastructure, GE Asset Management Incorporated and Dancap Private Equity Inc. In 2013, Porter's investors are listed as EdgeStone Capital Partners, OMERS Strategic Investments, GE Asset Management Incorporated and Dancap Private Equity Inc.

The then REGCO Holdings purchased the Toronto island airport assets of City Centre Aviation Ltd in 2005. This included the terminal used by Air Canada's Jazz airline, which at the time operated daily flights to Ottawa from the airport. On February 15, 2006, Air Canada had announced that its contract to operate its Jazz airline service out of the REGCO terminal at the airport had been terminated. On February 27, 2006, REGCO was able to evict Air Canada Jazz from the publicly-owned airport. Air Canada took the case to court but lost an Ontario Superior Court ruling. REGCO's fully owned subsidiary 'City Centre Aviation' (now Porter FBO) then commenced renovations of the terminal building to serve Porter Airlines, which started flights in October 2006. Porter FBO operates the terminal along with fuel and other services.

A new subsidiary, City Centre Terminal Corp., was set up in 2009 to manage Porter's new terminal at the Toronto island airport. The new terminal's cost of construction was estimated at  million. The first half of the new terminal opened on March 7, 2010. The terminal was completed in early 2011. The new terminal has ten gates, two lounges, check-in and security areas, and food outlets.

The airline's mascot is a stylised raccoon named "Mr. Porter". The raccoon appears in Porter newspaper ads. Porter also advertises on radio, using an announcer. The design of staff uniforms is based on 1960s standards of airline fashion. Porter has 933 employees as of March 31, 2010.

Porter was initially organized as a private company. On April 16, 2010, Porter Aviation Holdings announced they were going to be listed as a publicly traded company. The company filed a preliminary prospectus — a business plan — with securities commissions across the country, a requirement before it can offer shares. The company has $306 million of debt and leases and intended to raise $120 million of new shares in the company and order seven new Q400 planes. However, after twice delaying the final deadline for the offering, and lowering its share price from between $6 and $7 per share to $5.50, Porter cancelled the initial public offering. According to Robert Deluce "We came to the conclusion that it was really prudent to defer the offering at this time and to wait until better market conditions existed. We wanted to raise some capital. We thought the IPO was the way to go, but we weren't prepared in any way to sell our stock at just any price."

The media had openly speculated on the profitability of Porter as being a money-losing operation, as would be typical of a start-up. CEO Deluce had been asked by the media to provide information on the financial status of Porter, but declined. In its prospectus, the company outlined a loss of $4.6 million on revenues of $151 million for 2009. To be profitable, the airline needs to be filling 49.3% of its seats with paying customers. In 2009, the airline filled 41% of its seats, and in the first quarter of 2010, it filled 47%. Overall, the airline carried 900,000 passengers in 2009, 800,000 through Toronto island airport. In 2011, the airline filled 55.9% of its seats. As part of disclosure for its public offering, Porter disclosed that from its startup in 2006 until May 2010, Porter lost $44.5 million. In an interview with Toronto Life magazine in May 2013, Robert Deluce stated that Porter turned a profit in 2011 and 2012, and paid out profit sharing.

Porter sold the terminal at the island airport in Toronto to Nieuport Aviation Infrastructure Partners GP in January 2015. According to Deluce, this meant that the airline was debt-free, although it would now pay to lease the facility. The sale was estimated to be in the range of $750 million. Being debt-free was considered a good position to be in if it were to buy Bombardier CS100 jets to use at the island airport. However, in November 2015, the Government of Canada announced it would not support the expansion of the island airport to support the jets.

History

Porter Airlines' launch was controversial, as it pitted Toronto residents seeking to close or stop the expansion of the airport against business interests and a government agency determined to make the airport self-sufficient. Only Air Canada flew flights from the airport as part of its Jazz" service, operating daily flights to Ottawa after the closure of the regional airline City Express in 1991. In October 2002, the TPA announced a $35 million plan of improvements to the airport to expand its usage. The TPA planned to build a $15 million bridge and a $20 million airport terminal. A new regional airline would be launched at the airport, to be run by Robert Deluce, the former CEO of Air Ontario. Since its opening, the airport, located on Toronto Island, was accessible by passenger ferry only and the ferry-only access was seen as an obstacle to expansion. In a deal with the City of Toronto government, the TPA's plans were approved by Toronto City Council in November 2002.

The TPA's plans were opposed by neighbouring residents and community associations who together formed the Community Air special interest group to fight the expansion. The expansion became a primary issue in the 2003 Toronto municipal election. Mayoral candidates Barbara Hall and John Tory supported the bridge and David Miller opposed it. Miller and a slate of like-minded candidates for council ran on a common platform, the centrepiece of which was to stop the bridge. After Miller was elected mayor in November 2003, the new council voted to cancel the previous Council's decision, stopping the bridge project.

After the bridge was cancelled, Deluce launched a $505 million lawsuit against the City of Toronto and later expanded it to the Government of Canada. After receiving an unspecified amount of compensation from the TPA to settle the suit, his company bought the airport building that Jazz was using at the airport and cancelled Jazz's lease on January 31, 2006. Two days later, on February 2, 2006, he announced that Porter Airlines, a regional airline operating locally built Bombardier turboprops would begin service in 2006, operating from the airport, initially on a Toronto-Ottawa route. In a show of political support, the Porter press conference was staged at the Bombardier plant in suburban Toronto, where the airplanes are built, with support from Canadian Auto Workers leader Buzz Hargrove, who said it would create new employment opportunities in the region. On the same day the TPA announced plans to improve ferry service to serve the new airline, buying a $4.5 million, 150-passenger ferry.

Immediately, political opponents of the TPA, including Miller, City Council members, local community associations and local Members of Parliament Olivia Chow and Jack Layton expressed concern that the operation of a major airline from the island will cause increased noise and air pollution in the downtown core.

Concerns raised include safety. Porter solved this problem by fitting the planes for 70 passengers, less than the maximum load of 78 passengers. There are several cautions to pilots flying into the airport, including boat masts, a nearby wind turbine, and no-fly areas. The flight path into the airport requires the airplanes to fly an approach offset from the runway centre-line to avoid nearby hazards such as tall chimneys and buildings.

Jazz filed a $11.5 million lawsuit against the TPA and later, Porter, in the Ontario Superior Court in February 2006, alleging that the TPA signed contracts forcing Jazz out of the airport, causing a monopoly at the airport, and were anti-competitive. Jazz later filed a suit in Federal Court. On October 20, 2009, Jazz formally dropped its suit in Ontario Court, but plans to continue its lawsuit against Porter and the TPA in Federal Court. According to the announcement, Jazz dropped the matter in provincial court as the TPA is a federal agency, and the Airport is a federal facility. Damages in the federal case are not specified. Porter filed a counter-claim to Jazz' lawsuit citing damages of $850 million, based on Jazz agreement with Air Canada, and Porter has not dropped its counter-claim.

The airline's maiden flight took place on October 23, 2006 to Ottawa. When flights began, airline passengers were at first blocked by protesters at the ferry dock, urging a boycott of the service. Although on-site protests eventually stopped, Community Air continues to monitor Porter's operations along with those of the TPA. The TPA confirmed at its annual meeting of September 12, 2008, that Porter was fined for breaking noise curfews in its operations following complaints from local residents. The TPA commissioned a study to reduce noise from Porter's takeoffs and landings.

The TPA and Porter remain partners in the expansion of the airport. In January 2009, the TPA announced plans to purchase a new, larger passenger ferry to support Porter's expansion plans. The ferry was financed out of an improvement fee to be charged to passengers. The ferry had been proposed by Porter's Deluce to the TPA's Board of Directors over the period of March – June 2008. The decision to approve the $5 million ferry precipitated a conflict-of-interest investigation of TPA director Colin Watson, who is a self-described friend of Deluce's, and who voted in a 5–4 decision to approve the ferry. Watson was cleared of the charge by the federal ethics commissioner Mary Dawson in June 2009.

In April 2009, Porter announced that it would build a $45 million terminal at the island airport, with Canadian Customs, restaurants, car rental kiosks, expanded lounge space and office space totalling  . The terminal cost $50 million and its first phase opened on March 7, 2010. It was completed in 2011 and Porter hopes to add a US Customs section.

At the September 2009 annual meeting of the TPA, it was disclosed that Porter has broken its 11 p.m. curfew for landing at the airport three times in 2009, each time incurring a $5,000 fine. On one occasion, a Porter plane landed at the airport after-hours even after being advised by controllers to land at Pearson. According to Porter Airlines CEO Robert Deluce, "You know hundreds and hundreds and hundreds of flights come and go on a daily basis, so there are very, very few occasions where it happens. And there are also particular circumstances — and the circumstances are rare — to operate outside these normal times." According to the TPA, they are powerless to stop Porter other than imposing fines, and that planes landing at the airport when no controllers are present is not a safety risk. TPA director Mark McQueen has requested that the NAV Canada personnel stay on-site until the last flight has landed, but NAV Canada has refused to do so.

On February 9, 2012, Transport Canada advised Porter it had received an Access to Information request for what are called "Notices of Suspension issues to Porter." Such notices are departmental warnings with strict deadlines to deal with problems that could be safety related, but could also be demands to replace key personnel, like pilots, who have left the company. Transport Canada told Porter it was considering releasing some information and wanted a written response from the company detailing why any records should be withheld. Based on Porter's response, the department decided to release a censored version of the material in question. Porter went to court to prevent that from happening. On July 11, 2013 the federal court ruled in Porter's favour and the Confidentiality Order dated September 14, 2012 would remain in effect. A technical issue with Transport Canada's handling of the matter was cited as the reason for the ruling.

On January 10, 2013, 22 Porter ground crew members went on strike in Toronto. This was the airline's first labour dispute since it began business. In April 2013, Porter filed a libel lawsuit against the Canadian Office and Professional Employees union representing the 22 striking workers. Porter suit was for $4 million in damages for alleged defamatory statements made by the union using its Twitter account. The strike was settled in June 2013, and Porter's lawsuit was dropped.

In 2014, Montreal's Montréal/Saint-Hubert Airport settled four civil lawsuits and announced it was trying to get service to Toronto Island Airport as part of its expansion plans. According to Porter, there would need to be a brand new terminal built in order for the airline to start serving the airport, which the airport hoped to build with grants from the Government of Canada.

In June 2017, it was announced on Twitter that Porter Airlines had "blacklisted" the conservative Canadian media website "The Rebel Media", and had directly tweeted to Ezra Levant notifying him in person that they had removed their advertisements from Rebel Media's advertising space. Levant reacted by calling for a boycott of the airline. Porter Airlines subsequently apologized for the use of the word "blacklist".

2013 Toronto Island Airport expansion proposal
In April 2013, Porter announced expansion plans to serve new destinations in Western Canada, California and Florida. To support the expansion, Porter reached a provisional agreement to purchase 12 107-seat Bombardier CS100 jets, with a future option to purchase up to 18 more. Porter's plans required regulatory and facility changes to its Billy Bishop Toronto City Airport hub. Porter asked for modifications to the operating agreement of the airport to allow jets and extensions to the runway to support the new aircraft. Changes to the operating agreement require the unanimous agreement of the Toronto Port Authority (TPA), the City of Toronto and the Government of Canada. The TPA stated that it had no position on the expansion and would await a decision from Toronto City Council. Then-Toronto Mayor Rob Ford had indicated his support for the proposal while some councillors expressed their opposition with others urging further study.

Porter CEO Robert Deluce was already a supporter of Mayor Ford, having contributed the maximum $2,500 to Ford's mayoral campaign while other Deluce family members donated an additional $5,000 to Ford's campaign. Deluce privately sought Ford's support on the proposal before its public announcement but the meetings between Ford and Deluce raised controversy as Deluce had not registered with the city as a lobbyist.

When announcing the proposal, Porter Airlines claimed in advertisements that 2/3 of Torontonians polled supported the expansion. However, the result was disputed by pollster Warren Kinsella who considered the survey's trustworthiness tainted as it was done by Nick Kouvalis, Ford's 2010 campaign manager, and the questions were 'directing' the result. The No Jets TO group filed a complaint with the Advertising Standards Council of Canada, calling the ads "patently false".

Toronto City Council held public consultations on the proposal during the fall of 2013, leading to a city staff report addressing the proposal. At the same time, Porter mounted a public relations campaign, based around the porterplans.com web site. Porter customers were telephoned and e-mailed and radio and newspaper advertisements were bought by Porter asking for the public to register their support with Toronto Council. After the consultation, and study of consultant reports, City staff recommended in a report to delay acting on the proposal until 2015. Concerns about the required infrastructure, public health concerns and the lack of an airport master plan were cited by staff. The TPA was also seeking an extension of the airport management agreement as a condition of the proposal. City Council's Executive Committee on December 5 voted to delay consideration of the proposal until 2014.

In January 2014, the Toronto Port Authority announced that it would seek $100 million from the federal government to expand infrastructure around the airport if the expansion plans and jets were approved for use at the airport. Another public hearing at Council was announced for January 27, 2014. At that time, Toronto City Council announced it could not support the proposal without further studies from Ports Toronto, leading the body to initiate a series of investigation and viability analyses. In November 2015, federal Minister of Transport Marc Garneau announced he would not support the proposal and in December 2015, the TPA (rebranded as PortsToronto 11 months before) announced that it had "halted work on an environmental assessment and two studies" it had commissioned concerning the expansion.

Destinations
, Porter Airlines flies to the following destinations:

In 2016, Porter ran a small number of flights from Toronto and Ottawa to Winnipeg to test this potential market.

Interline agreements
Porter Airlines operates Worldwide Connections from its home base at Billy Bishop Toronto City Airport to the world via the United States.

 Aer Lingus (EWR, IAD, BOS)
 Air China (EWR, IAD)
 Air France (EWR, IAD, BOS)
 Air India (EWR, IAD)
 All Nippon Airways (IAD)
 American Airlines (BOS)
 Austrian Airlines (EWR, IAD, BOS)
 Avianca (IAD)
 Avianca El Salvador (EWR, IAD)
 Azores Airlines (BOS)
 British Airways (EWR, IAD, BOS)
 Brussels Airlines (IAD)
 Cabo Verde Airlines (IAD, BOS)
 Cathay Pacific (EWR, IAD, BOS)
 Copa Airlines (IAD, BOS)
 Delta Air Lines (BOS)
 Egyptair (IAD)
 El Al (EWR, BOS)
 Emirates (EWR, IAD, BOS)
 Ethiopian Airlines (EWR, IAD)
 Etihad Airways (IAD)
 French Bee (EWR)
 Hainan Airlines (BOS)
 Iberia (IAD, BOS)
 Icelandair (EWR, IAD, BOS)
 Japan Airlines (BOS)
 JetBlue (BOS)
 KLM (IAD, BOS)
 Korean Air (IAD, BOS)
 La Compagnie (EWR)
 LOT Polish Airlines (EWR, IAD)
 Lufthansa (EWR, IAD, BOS)
 Qatar Airways (IAD, BOS)
 Royal Air Maroc (IAD, BOS)
 Saudia (IAD)
 Scandinavian Airlines (EWR, IAD, BOS)
 Singapore Airlines (EWR)
 South African Airways (IAD)
 Swiss International Air Lines (EWR, IAD, BOS)
 TAP Air Portugal (EWR, IAD, BOS)
 Turkish Airlines (EWR, IAD, BOS)
 United Airlines (EWR, IAD)
 Virgin Atlantic (IAD, BOS)
 Volaris Costa Rica (IAD)

Fleet

, Porter Airlines operates the following aircraft:

Originally, Porter ordered ten 70-seat Bombardier Q400 turboprops, with ten more as options, at a value estimated by Porter of over $500 million. In June 2009, Porter exercised the option on the 19th and 20th Dash 8s. Porter chose the 70-seat configuration (less than the maximum of 78 seats) due to the short length of the runway at Toronto Island Airport; a fully loaded 78-seat configuration would need a longer runway than available at the airport. This means Porter aircraft have a slightly greater seat pitch than a 78-seat aircraft. The 70-seat configuration also allows Porter to use the shorter runway 11/29 at Newark. In May 2010, Porter announced that it intended to order seven more Dash 8 Q400. On August 6, 2010, it was announced that Porter had ordered four more Q400s with options for six more. In November 2011, Porter Airlines accepted two new Bombardier Q400 NextGen aircraft, bringing the company's fleet to 26. In late 2013, Porter added an additional 4 seats to all of their Q400s, giving them a total of 74 seats per aircraft. In 2021, the airline updated its interiors with TiSeat E2 seats, adding an extra row, and giving all their aircraft 78 seats each.

In April 2013, Porter Airlines announced a conditional (if Bishop Airport is expanded) purchase agreement for up to thirty Bombardier CS100 (Airbus A220-100) aircraft, including purchase rights for six more Q400 NextGen aircraft. Porter had signed a letter of intent with Bombardier in December 2012. On November 13, 2015, Canada's transport minister Marc Garneau released a statement saying that the government would not reopen the Tripartite agreement, cancelling the expansion of the airport.

In July 2016, Porter announced the purchase of a further three Q400 planes. Deluce stated that it still had its deposit in place for the 2013 order of jets and six Q400s, as "something we are looking at carefully".

On July 12, 2021, Porter announced that it would purchase 30 Embraer E195-E2 jet aircraft, with purchase rights for an additional 50 aircraft.  As Bishop Airport does not allow jets under its terms of operation, the airline announced that they would base the planes out of their hubs at Montreal, Ottawa, Halifax, and Toronto's Pearson International Airport and would be able to serve an expanding list of destinations across Canada, Mexico and the United States.  With deliveries scheduled starting in the second half of 2022, Porter will become the North American launch customer for the Embraer E2 series.

In July 2022, Porter announced a firm order for 20 Embraer E195-E2 passenger jets with a total list price value of US$1.56 billion, bringing its orders with Embraer to a total of 50 firm commitments and 50 purchase rights.

Services

In Toronto, Porter provides a bus shuttle from the downtown Royal York Hotel to the airport ferry dock and tunnel entrance. The 4 buses (mix of Blue Bird Corporation Ultra LF and New Flyer Industries D40LF) are operated by TOK Coachlines. The shuttle service had moved to the Royal York from its original location at 20 York Street, next to Union Station, in March 2008, when city construction for the Simcoe Street Tunnel blocked access. Porter planned to return to the location, but in September 2009, Porter was evicted from the 20 York Street building due to non-payment of rent.

Porter used to provide complimentary snacks and beverages at their lounges at Toronto's Billy Bishop, Ottawa International and Newark Liberty Airport, but have since discontinued this, since selling the terminal building in Toronto to Nieuport Aviation, who opted to include more traditional restaurant offerings. They have since also closed their Newark lounge. Porter still does, however, continue to provide complimentary snacks and beverages, including alcohol, on board their aircraft. Porter Airlines offers a frequent flyer rewards program called 'VIPorter', whereby points can be redeemed for free flights. On August 3, 2018 the airline announced a deal to have VIPorter replaced by Aeroplan as the company's loyalty program. However, following Air Canada's reacquisition of Aeroplan, this deal was terminated.

References

Notes

External links

Regional airlines of Ontario
Air Transport Association of Canada
Airlines established in 2006
Canadian brands
OMERS
Canadian companies established in 2006
2006 establishments in Ontario
Companies based in Toronto